is a Japanese financial holding company and a principal member of the Nomura Group. It, along with its broker-dealer, banking and other financial services subsidiaries, provides investment, financing and related services to individual, institutional, and government customers on a global basis with an emphasis on securities businesses.

History

Origins

The history of Nomura began on December 25, 1925, when  Nomura Securities Co., Ltd. (NSC) was established in Osaka, as a spin-off from Securities Dept. of Osaka Nomura Bank Co., Ltd (the present day Resona Bank). NSC initially focused on the bond market. It was named after its founder Tokushichi Nomura II, a wealthy Japanese businessman and investor. He had earlier established Osaka Nomura bank in 1918, based on the Mitsui zaibatsu model with a capital of ¥10 million. Like the majority of Japanese conglomerates, or zaibatsu, its origins were in Osaka, but today operates out of Tokyo. NSC gained the authority to trade stock in 1938, and went public in 1961.

Lehman Brothers Acquisition
In October 2008, Nomura acquired most of Lehman Brothers Asian operations together with its European equities and investment banking units to make one of the world's largest independent investment banks with ¥20,300bn (£138bn) assets under management. In April 2009, the global headquarters for investment banking was moved out of Tokyo to London as part of a strategy to move the company's focus from Japan to global markets, with Josh Tokley appointed Head of UK Investments. Following his subsequent suspension, Tokley was replaced by Michael Coombs.

Nomura paid $225 million for the purchase of Lehman's Asia-Pacific unit. Due to large losses with shares dropping to their lowest level in nearly 37 years, Nomura cut around 5 percent of its staff in Europe (as many as 500 people) in mid-September 2011.

Greentech Acquisition
In December 2019, Nomura announced that it would acquire Greentech Capital Advisors, a boutique investment bank with stated aims of assisting clients across sustainable technology and infrastructure. The transaction is expected to close on March 31, 2020.

Greentech will be rebranded to "Nomura Greentech" and will form part of their Investment Banking franchise in the U.S.

Nomura Holdings and member companies 
Nomura Holdings, Inc. is the holding company of the Nomura Group and the group's principal member. As a keiretsu, Nomura Holdings, Inc. does not directly run member companies, rather it keeps a controlling stake of cross shareholdings and manages financial assistance among member companies which help to deflect hostile takeovers.

Core members
 Nomura Holding America Inc., operates as a subsidiary of Nomura Holdings, Inc.
 Nomura Europe Holdings plc, operates as a subsidiary of Nomura Holdings, Inc.
 Nomura Asia Holding N.V., operates as a subsidiary of Nomura Holdings, Inc.
 Nomura Securities, operates as a subsidiary of Nomura Holdings, Inc.
 Nomura Research Institute
 Nomura Financial Products Europe GmbH
 Nomura Asset Management Co., Ltd.
 The Nomura Trust & Banking Co.
 Nomura Babcock & Brown Co., Ltd.
 Nomura Capital Investment Co., Ltd.
 Nomura Investor Relations Co., Ltd.
 Nomura Principal Finance Co., Ltd.
 Nomura Funds Research And Technologies Co., Ltd.
 Nomura Pension Support & Service Co., Ltd.
 Nomura Research & Advisory Co., Ltd.
 Nomura Business Services Co., Ltd.
 Nomura Satellite Communications Co., Ltd.
 Nomura Facilities, Inc.
 Nomura Institute of Capital Markets Research
 Nomura Services India Pvt. Ltd.
 Nomura Healthcare
 Nomura Private Equity Capital
 Unified Partners
 Nomura Agri Planning & Advisory
 Instinet

Marketing and branding 
The marketing slogan of Nomura is "Connecting Markets East & West".

References

External links 

 www.nomuraholdings.com

 
Companies listed on the New York Stock Exchange
Companies listed on the Tokyo Stock Exchange
Companies listed on the Osaka Exchange
Companies listed on the Singapore Exchange
Banks of Japan
Financial services companies based in Tokyo
Financial services companies established in 1925
Holding companies based in Tokyo
Midori-kai
Holding companies established in 1925
Japanese companies established in 1925
Banks established in 1925